Kulemin or Kulyomin (from kulema meaning a trap for hunting small animals) is a Russian masculine surname, its feminine counterpart is Kulemina or Kulyomina. It may refer to
Kirill Kulemin (born 1980), Russian rugby union player
Maksim Kulyomin (born 1989), Russian footballer
Nikolay Kulemin (born 1986), Russian ice hockey player
Vyacheslav Kulyomin (born 1990), Russian ice hockey forward

References

Russian-language surnames